Pauli Tavisalo (29 January 1928 – 30 March 2006) was a Finnish sprinter. He competed in the men's 100 metres at the 1952 Summer Olympics.

References

External links

1928 births
2006 deaths
Athletes (track and field) at the 1952 Summer Olympics
Finnish male sprinters
Olympic athletes of Finland